Provincial Trunk Highway 26 (PTH 26) is a provincial highway in the Canadian province of Manitoba. It is an east-west route that begins and ends at the Trans-Canada Highway (PTH 1). PTH 26 provides access to the small communities of St. François Xavier and Poplar Point. It serves as an alternative scenic route between Portage la Prairie and Winnipeg as it closely follows the Assiniboine River which flows south of the highway.

History
Between 1928 and 1938, PTH 26 was originally designated for the portion of highway between Brandon and Minnedosa. This became part of PTH 10 in 1938. 

Prior to 1958, the current PTH 26 was part of the original PTH 1.  The current route for PTH 1, which provides more a direct course between Winnipeg and Portage la Prairie, was constructed in 1958.  The section that was replaced by the new route, the current-day PTH 26, was then designated as part of the transprovincial PTH 4, along with current PTH 9, 16, and 44.

In 1968, it was renumbered to its current designation.

Major intersections

References

External links

Historical Tour: Highway 26

026